Şerefhan, formerly Taşdamlar) is a village in the Çelikhan District, Adıyaman Province, Turkey. The village is populated by Kurds of the Reşwan tribe and had a population of 324 in 2021.

The hamlets of Çat, Esen, Havuzbaşı and İncesu are attached to Şerefhan.

References

Villages in Çelikhan District
Kurdish settlements in Adıyaman Province